Ocie Eldridge Richie (November 16, 1921 – February 5, 2012) is an American former professional basketball player. He played for the Rochester Royals in the National Basketball League for one game during the 1946–47 season. He also competed in the Southern Professional Basketball League for various teams, even serving as the player-coach for much of the Memphis Legionnaires' 1947–48 team.

Richie played one year of basketball for the University of Arkansas, and two years in both basketball and track for Northwestern State University. In 1980 he was inducted into Northwestern State's Hall of Fame.

References

1921 births
2012 deaths
American men's basketball players
Arkansas Razorbacks men's basketball players
Basketball players from Louisiana
Forwards (basketball)
Northwestern State Demons basketball players
Northwestern State Demons track and field athletes
Player-coaches
Rochester Royals players
Sportspeople from Natchitoches, Louisiana
United States Navy personnel of World War II